The 40th Metro Manila Film Festival was the edition of the annual film festival that is held in Metro Manila, Philippines and is organized by the Metro Manila Development Authority (MMDA). During the film festival, no foreign films are shown in Philippine cinemas and theaters (except IMAX theaters) in order to showcase locally produced films. The film festival began on December 23, 2014 and was kicked off by the yearly Parade of Stars' float parade starting from the Quirino Grandstand. It is expected to run until January 7 of the following year.

The awards night commenced on December 27, 2014 at the Philippine International Convention Center, and was hosted by Edu Manzano and Kris Aquino. It was also aired via delayed telecast on ABS-CBN.

Entries

Official entries 
The official list of entries were announced on June 21, 2014. From the 13 submissions, 8 were chosen for the festival;

New Wave entries
MMDA started to accept entries for the New Wave category until October 7, 2014. On October 24, 2014, the official list of entries were announced. Films were screened on selected cinemas from December 17 to 24, 2014.

Student shorts
 Bimyana - Kim Zuñiga, De La Salle–College of Saint Benilde 
 Bundok Chubibo - Glenn Barit, University of the Philippines Diliman
 Kalaw - Immy Belle Rempis, Asia Pacific Film Institute
 Kubli - Regine Ynieto, Far Eastern University
 Siyanawa - Gio Alpuente, Southern Luzon State University
 Ang Soltera -  Arielle Louise Naguit, De La Salle Lipa

Animated films
 Cherry - Dustin Uy
 Gymsnatch - Eric Dequitos
 Isip-Bata -  Eugene Ceriola & Keith Bercero
 An Maogmang Lugar - Mary Ann Espedido
 Shifter - Jerico Fuentes

Awards

Major awards 

The following are the winners of the mainstream category:

Other awards
Commemorative Award for Vision and Leadership – Joseph Estrada
Special MMFF 40th Year Award – Francis Tolentino
Special Recognition Award  (posthumous) – Guillermo de Vega; accepted by wife Maria de Vega
Face of the Night – Nadine Lustre

New Wave category 
The following are the winners of the New Wave category:
Best Picture – Magkakabaung
Best Director – Jason Paul Laxamana, Magkakabaung
Best Actor – Allen Dizon, Magkakabaung
Best Actress – Zsa Zsa Padilla, M (Mother's Maiden Name)
Best Supporting Actor – Kristoffer King, Maratabat (Pride and Honor)
Best Supporting Actress – Gloria Sevilla, M (Mother's Maiden Name)
Special Jury Prize – M (Mother's Maiden Name)
Best Student Film – Bundok Chubibo by Glenn Barit
Student Film Special Jury Prize – ''Kalaw by Immy RempisBest Animation Film – An Maogmang Lugar by Mary EspedidoAnimation Film Special Jury Prize – Cherry'' by Dustin Uy

Multiple awards

Mainstream

New Wave

Box Office gross
The Metro Manila Development Authority was criticized for releasing incomplete official earnings of each film. This led to some film studios releasing their own earnings.

References

External links 
 
Special coverage of the 40th MMFF by Philippine Entertainment Portal
IMDb:2014 MMFF

Metro Manila Film Festival
MMFF
MMFF
MMFF
MMFF
2015 in Philippine cinema
December 2014 events in the Philippines
January 2015 events in the Philippines